Steven Robb (born 8 March 1982 in Perth, Scotland) is a Scottish retired footballer, who played as a left winger. He began his career with Dundee in 2001 before joining Dundee United and then St Mirren. After playing in Thailand for Thai Port, he returned to Scotland with Brechin City and then Montrose. He retired in 2015 at the age of 32, due to injury problems.

Career
Robb started his career in 2001 as a youth team player with Dundee, going on to make over 80 league appearances with a short loan spell with Raith Rovers. At the end of the 2004–2005 season in which Dundee were relegated to the Scottish First Division, Robb decided to stay with Dundee but after failure to gain promotion Robb left the Dees for Dundee's rivals Dundee United in June 2006 on a free transfer. He scored his first and only goal for United in 1-1 draw with Motherwell on 10 March 2007. Robb was told he would be released from Tannadice at the end of the 2007–08 season, with the winger subsequently agreeing a move to St Mirren at the start of the summer transfer window. Robb scored his first goal on his debut in the 7–0 victory over Dumbarton in the League Cup. He scored his first league goal for the club in a 2-1 defeat to Aberdeen in March 2010.

After being released by St Mirren, Robb took a chance moving to Thai side Thai Port.

At the start of the 2013–14 season, Robb returned to Scotland and signed for Brechin City. He scored his first and only goal for Brechin in a 2-1 loss to Rangers.

At the beginning of the 2014–15 season Robb put pen to paper with Montrose. He retired at the end of that season and moved into business with a clothing company alongside fellow retired player Mark Corcoran, taking advantage of personal contacts made in his football career and in the fabric industry in Thailand.

Statistics
Correct at 18 May 2009

References

External links

1982 births
Living people
Footballers from Perth, Scotland
Scottish footballers
Scottish Premier League players
Scottish Football League players
Dundee F.C. players
Raith Rovers F.C. players
Dundee United F.C. players
St Mirren F.C. players
Association football midfielders
Steven Robb
Expatriate footballers in Thailand
Steven Robb
Brechin City F.C. players
Montrose F.C. players
Scottish Professional Football League players
Scottish expatriate footballers
Scottish expatriate sportspeople in Thailand